Samuel Dickinson  Burchard (September 6, 1812 – September 25, 1891) was a 19th-century American Presbyterian Church minister from New York.

Biography
Born in Steuben, New York, Burchard moved to Kentucky with his parents in 1830, attended Centre College and graduated in 1837. He was licensed to preach in 1838. He was pastor of several Presbyterian churches in New York City. Burchard was chancellor of the Ingham University, and president of Rutgers female college. He died at Saratoga, New York.

Burchard originated the phrase, "Rum, Romanism, and Rebellion" and applied it to the Democratic Party near the end of the Blaine-Cleveland campaign in the 1884 United States presidential election. The phrase was said to have cost Republican Blaine the presidency.

He died in Saratoga, New York on September 25, 1891.

References

Further reading
 

1812 births
1891 deaths
American Presbyterian ministers
Centre College alumni
Critics of the Catholic Church
New York (state) Republicans
People from Oneida County, New York
People from Danville, Kentucky
Presbyterians from New York (state)
19th-century American clergy